Darreh Ziarat or Darreh-ye Ziarat or Darreh Zeyarat or Darreh Ziyarat, also rendered as Darre Ziarat, may refer to:
 Darreh Ziarat-e Olya
 Darreh Ziarat-e Sofla